The 1901–02 Kansas Jayhawks men's basketball team represented the University of Kansas in its fourth season of collegiate basketball. The Jayhawks were ked by 4th year head coach James Naismith. The Jayhawks finished the season 5–7.

Roster
Joseph Alford
Donald Alford
Harry Allen
Clyde Allphin
Paul Atkinson
Charles Fees
Albert Hicks
Charles Jennings
Frederick Owens
Arthur Pooler
Chester Smith
John Tolan

Schedule

References

Kansas Jayhawks men's basketball seasons
Kansas
Kansas
Kansas